Virginia School for Girls, also known as Hujun School for Girls, was a school in Huzhou, Zhejiang, China. It was run by Christian missionaries. Its buildings are now used by Huzhou No. 1 People's Hospital, and are listed by the Huzhou government as protected heritage architecture.

Notable alumni
Wang Huiwu

References

Schools in Zhejiang
Huzhou
Girls' schools in China